The 1998 United States Senate election in Colorado was held November 3, 1998, alongside other elections to the United States Senate in other states as well as elections to the United States House of Representatives and various state and local elections. Incumbent Republican U.S. Senator Ben Nighthorse Campbell won re-election to a second term by a landslide.

Democratic primary

Candidates 
 Dottie Lamm, former First Lady of Colorado
 Gil Romero

Results

Republican primary

Candidates 
 Ben Nighthorse Campbell, incumbent U.S. Senator
 Bill Eggert, 1994 Republican congressional candidate

Results

General election

Candidates 
 Ben Nighthorse Campbell (R), incumbent U.S. Senator
 Dottie Lamm, former First Lady of Colorado

Campaign 
Campbell, who was elected in 1992 as a Democrat, switched parties after the 1994 Republican Revolution. He faced a primary challenger, but won with over 70% of the vote. In the general election, Democratic nominee Dottie Lamm criticized Campbell of flip flopping from being a moderate liberal to moderate conservative. In fact, throughout the entire campaign, Lamm mostly sent out negative attack advertisements about Campbell.

Results

See also 
 1998 United States Senate elections

References 

United States Senate
Colorado
1998